Wizja lokalna 1901 is a Polish historical film. It was released in 1981. The film was screened for the Directors' Fortnight of the 1981 Cannes Film Festival.

References

External links
 

1981 films
Polish historical films
1980s Polish-language films
1980s historical films